The Saudi Central Bank, previously known as the Saudi Arabian Monetary Authority (SAMA), established in 1952, is the central bank of the Kingdom of Saudi Arabia. After the name change in 2020, the Saudi Central Bank continued to use the same acronym (SAMA).

History
Prior to the establishment of the Saudi Central Bank, the Saudi Hollandi Bank, a branch of the Netherlands Trading Society from 1926 acted as a de facto central bank.  It kept the Kingdom's gold reserves and received oil revenues on behalf of the Saudi Arabian government. In 1928 it assisted in the establishment of a new Saudi silver coin, commissioned by King Abdulaziz which became the Kingdom's first independent currency. The Saudi Hollandia Bank handed over its responsibilities to the SAMA when it was established in 1952 and became a model for other foreign banks in the kingdom. The building's current headquarters, which was built in 1985 was designed by American architect Minoru Yamasaki. 

The modern central bank operates through regulatory infrastructure developed by Irish firm Vizor. In March 2020 and April 2020, the SAMA moved 150 billion Saudi riyals (US$ 40 billion) to the Public Investment Fund (PIF). US$ 25 billion was transferred in April and US$ 15 billion in May.

Functions 
SAMA is the Central Bank of Saudi Arabia, the functions of the SAMA include issuing the national currency, the Saudi Riyal, supervising commercial banks, managing foreign exchange reserves, promoting price and exchange rate stability, and ensuring the growth and soundness of the financial system, operating a number of cross-bank electronic financial systems such as MADA (previously SPAN), SARIE, and SADAD.

List of governors

Leadership and structure 

A board of directors oversees the operations of SAMA.  This comprises the governor, vice-governor and three other nominated members from the private sector. The terms of appointment are 4 years for the governor and vice-governor, extendable by Royal decree, and 5 years for the other members, also extendable by Royal decree. Members of the board cannot be removed except by Royal decree.

The SAMA senior management comprises the governor, the vice-governor and five deputy governors.

Board of Directors

Senior Management

Balance sheet 
The SAMA balance sheet is denominated in Saudi Riyals, which is pegged at an official rate of 3.75 against the US dollar.  All currency notes issued by SAMA are fully backed by equivalent gold deposits.

(Millions of Saudi Riyals)

2012 figures are at end of 1st quarter.

SAMA Foreign Holdings 

In addition to its functions, the Saudi Central Bank controls SAMA Foreign Holdings, the sovereign wealth fund of Saudi Arabia. The fund is the third largest sovereign wealth fund in the world, with assets of over $700 billion.

In October 2015, Governor Fahad Abdullah Al-Mubarak of the Saudi Central Bank was ranked #2 on the Public Investor 100.

See also 

 Capital Market Authority (Saudi Arabia)
 Electronic Securities Information System
 List of banks in Saudi Arabia
 List of financial regulatory authorities by country
 SADAD
 Saudi Payments Network (SPAN)
 Saudi riyal
 Tadawul

References

External links
SAMA Official Website
Encyclopædia Britannica
SAMA SWFI Profile

1952 establishments in Saudi Arabia
Banks established in 1952
Banks of Saudi Arabia
Saudi Arabia
Government agencies of Saudi Arabia
Sovereign wealth funds